San Miguel Amatlán  is a town and municipality in Oaxaca in south-western Mexico. The municipality covers an area of 15.31 km2. 
It is part of the Ixtlán District in the Sierra Norte region.

As of 2005, the municipality had a total population of 1012.

References

Municipalities of Oaxaca